Kelly Elizabeth Faris (born January 16, 1991) is an American former basketball player. Faris played shooting guard for the Connecticut women's basketball team, and won two national championships in 2010 and 2013. She was on a post-season championship team for five consecutive seasons, including four consecutive high school state championships and two NCAA championship. She was drafted 11th overall by the Connecticut Sun in the 2013 WNBA draft.

Early life
Faris is daughter of Bob and Connie Faris. Faris has two older sisters Kristi and Kimmi and one older brother Patrick. She played on the Indiana's Finest AAU team which won the National Championship in 2003 for the 11U division (players age 11 and under).

High school career
Faris played basketball at Heritage Christian high school in Indianapolis, Indiana, where the Eagles had an amazing combined record of 108–8. Faris helped lead the high school to four consecutive IHSAA Class 2A state championships. This accomplishment earned the team a congratulatory resolution from the General Assembly of the State of Indiana. The team was 12–12 in the season before Faris arrived at Heritage Christian.  During her junior year, Faris achieved a quadruple-double vs Harding High School Hawks on November 24, 2007, Faris scored 14 points, had 10 rebounds, 10 assists and 10 steals and was named MVP of the 2008 state tournament. Faris finished her career as Heritage's High School's all-time leader in rebounds (1,015), assists (526), blocks (108) and steals (493) ranks second among the school's all-time scoring leaders (1,426 points). Faris was named to the all-state first team in 2007, 2008, and 2009. 

In addition to basketball, she also participated in volleyball and track, lettering in both sports, and earning all-state honors in volleyball for both 2007 and 2008. She also won national honors in 2007, being named to the 2007 AAU Junior National Volleyball Championships All-American team. She was also an excellent student, earning High Academic Honors as a senior, and being a member of National Honors Society. Faris was selected as a McDonald's All-American. She participated in the McDonald's All-Star game with four points, seven rebounds, three assists, three steals and two blocked shots while playing for the East Team in the 2009 game.

College career

Faris wore number 34, a number worn by her siblings.  Faris led UConn to a 143–11 record over her four-year career, which included four Final Four appearances and two National Championships. She is the second player in Connecticut basketball history to record more than 1,000 points, 750 rebounds, 500 assists and 250 steals; the other player to reach this milestone was Maya Moore. In her senior year, Faris was named the Big East Defensive player of the year, and shared honors for the Big East most improved player of the year.  She finished her career ranking 40th in points (1,109), 6th in steals (294), and 11th in assists (525).

College statistics

Professional career
Faris was selected 11th overall in the 2013 WNBA draft by the Connecticut Sun. She played for the Sun from 2013 to 2016, averaging 2.1 points and 1.6 rebounds in 112 games.

In September 2013, she signed with EuroLeague Women team UNIQA Euroleasing Sopron in Hungary.

Faris signed with Adelaide Lightning of the Women's National Basketball League for the 2014–15 season. She was released by the club in December that same year with the team in last place. For the season she averaged 3.8 points, 3.5 rebounds and 1.2 assists.

In January 2016, Faris signed with the Flying Foxes Post SV Wien of the Austrian Women's Basketball Bundesliga. She helped the Flying Foxes to both the national championship, the Austrian Cup, where she was named the Cup's Final Four MVP, and to the Austrian-Slovak Women Basketball League championship.

In February 2017, she signed with  Bnot Hertzeliya of the Israeli Female Basketball Premier League where she averaged 13.9 points in five games.

In February 2018, Faris signed a training camp contract with the New York Liberty. In August 2018, Faris signed with Breiðablik of the Icelandic Úrvalsdeild kvenna. She left the team in January 2019. In 14 games in the Úrvalsdeild, Faris averaged 20.9 points, 12.1 rebounds and 3.6 assists per game. 

On February 11, 2019, Faris signed a training camp contract with the New York Liberty for the second straight year. She was released by the Liberty on May 20, prior to the start of the season.

USA Basketball
Faris was selected to play in the USA Women's Youth Development Festival. Eligible players are female basketball players who are in their sophomore or junior in high school. The 2007 event took place at the US Olympic Training Center in Colorado Springs, CO.

Faris was a member of the USA Women's U18 team which won the gold medal at the FIBA Americas Championship in Buenos Aires, Argentina. The event was held in July 2008, when the USA team defeated host Argentina to win the championship. Faris helped the team win all five games, assisting on 17 baskets, only one fewer than the team high 18.

Faris continued on to the USA Women's U19 team which represented the USA in the 2009 U19 World's Championship, held in Bangkok, Thailand in July and August 2009. Although the USA team lost the opening game to Spain, they went on to win their next seven games to earn a rematch against Spain in the finals, and won the game 81–71 to earn the gold medal. Faris was the high scorer with 13 points in the game against Mali.

Awards and honors
 2003—AAU Basketball National Championship 11U
 2007—AAU Junior National Volleyball Championships All-American team.
 2007—First Team, All-State (Indiana 2A)
 2008—First Team, All-State (Indiana 2A)
 2008—MVP State Tournament (Indiana 2A)
 2009—First Team, All-State (Indiana 2A)
 2009—McDonald's All-America
 2009—Parade Magazine All-America first team
 2009—USA Today All-USA second team honors
 2013—Big East Defensive Player of the Year.
 2013—Big East Most Improved Player of the Year.
 2013—NCAA Final Four All-Tournament team.

See also
 2009–10 Connecticut Huskies women's basketball team
 List of Connecticut Huskies women's basketball players with 1000 points

References

1991 births
Living people
American expatriate basketball people in Australia
American expatriate basketball people in Hungary
American women's basketball players
Basketball players from Indiana
Breiðablik women's basketball players
Connecticut Sun draft picks
Connecticut Sun players
Guards (basketball)
McDonald's High School All-Americans
Parade High School All-Americans (girls' basketball)
People from Plainfield, Indiana
UConn Huskies women's basketball players
Úrvalsdeild kvenna basketball players